Washington Justice is an American professional Overwatch esports team based in Washington, D.C. The Justice compete in the Overwatch League (OWL) as member of the league's West region. Founded in 2018, Washington Justice began play as one of eight expansion teams in 2019. The team is owned by Washington Kastles owner Mark Ein, who founded Washington Esports Ventures to purchase the franchise. The team has reached the season playoffs two times.

Franchise history

OWL expansion 
On September 7, 2018, Activision Blizzard announced that Washington Esports Ventures, a venture led by businessman and Washington Kastles owner Mark Ein, had purchased an expansion team based in Washington, D.C. for Overwatch League's second season. "Esports is far and away the fastest growing platform in the world of sports," Ein said in an interview. "Most traditional sports are declining or flat. Esports is exploding. The growth, by any measure—participation and viewership—is showing significant double-digit growth."

On September 12, Washington announced the signing of former New York Excelsior coach Kim "WizardHyeong" Hyeong-seok as the team's head coach. Eight days later, Washington signed Molly "AVALLA" Kim as an analyst; AVALLA is the first female coach to be signed in the history of the Overwatch League.

On November 29, the team revealed they would be called Washington Justice.

Early years: 2019–present 
Washington Justice's first regular season OWL match was on February 16, 2019, against the New York Excelsior in which Washington lost 1–3. The Justice's first victory did not come until the last match of Stage 1, when on March 17, the team defeated the Florida Mayhem by a score of 3–2, giving Washington a Stage 1 record of 1–6. Despite numerous pickup throughout the season, including the acquisitions of Hong "ArK" Yeon-jun from the New York Excelsior and Nikola "sleepy" Andrews from the San Francisco Shock, the Justice struggled throughout the first three stages of the season, posting a 2–19 record in the first 21 games. However, they team performed much better after the league's implementation of an enforced 2-2-2 role lock for Stage 4. Behind the damage duo of Ethan "Stratus" Yankel and Corey "Corey" Nigra, the team lost only one match in their final seven games to finish the in 17th place with an 8–20 record.

Following the 2019 season, the Justice parted ways with their entire coaching staff. The team also parted ways with six of their players, leaving Stratus, Corey, and ArK, as well as the tank duo Lukas "Lullsish" Wiklund and Elliot "Ellivote" Vaneryd, who did not play in the 2019 season due to visa issues. Washington signed former Los Angeles Gladiators assistant coach Seetoh "JohnGalt" Jian Qing as their new head coach and picked up several veterans to the team, such as support player Kwon "AimGod" Min-seok and tank player Gye "Roar" Chang-hoon. After a 3–9 start to the 2020 season, both Corey and Stratus retired. Shifting to an all-Korean roster, the team picked up former Vancouver Titans players Choi "JJanu" Hyeon-woo and Lee "Stitch" Chung-hee in late May to early June. Head coach JohnGalt left the team shortly after the signing of Stitch, and Washington promoted performance coach Han "Sup7eme" Seung-jun as their new head coach. After finishing the 2020 regular season with a 4–17 record, the Justice swept both the Vancouver Titans and Dallas Fuel in the North America play-in tournament to qualify for the season playoffs. Ahead of the North America playoffs, the Justice signed former Dallas Fuel damage player Jang "Decay" Gui-un. In their first match in the North America bracket, Washington squandered an early 2–0 lead over the San Francisco Shock and lost by a score of 2–3, sending them to the lower bracket. The Justice won their next two games, defeating the third-seeded Paris Eternal and fourth-seeded Florida Mayhem. Needing one more win to qualify for the Grand Finals Bracket, Washington next faced the top-seeded Philadelphia Fusion. However, the Justice lost the match, 0–3, ending their playoff run.

Ahead of the 2021 season, the Justice parted ways with several players, including AimGod, Stitch, JJanu, and ArK. The team upgraded their tank lineup with the signings of touted rookie prospect Kim "Mag" Tae-sung and former Fusion player Kim "Fury" Jun-ho, while looking to improve their support lineup with the signings of veterans Jung "Closer" Won-sik and Yoon "BeBe" Hee-chang. The team also brought in three damage players to compliment Decay, such as rookie Kim "Assassin" Sung-won. In the first tournament cycle of the season, the May Melee, the Justice were one of two teams to go 4–0 in the qualifier stage. However, the team lost to the Florida Mayhem in the regional knockouts, failing to advance to the interregional tournament. The team went through hot and cold streaks throughout the season, ending with a 9–7 regular season record. The finish advanced the team to the West region play-in tournament; after the Justice defeated the Houston Outlaws in the finals, they advanced to the season playoffs as the eighth, and final, seed. The team was unable to secure a win in the playoffs, losing to the Dallas Fuel, 1–3, and Atlanta Reign, 0–3.

Team identity 
On November 29, 2018, the franchise name was revealed as the Washington Justice; the name "Justice" represents the teams core values. "Justice is a universal value and the perfect name for a franchise that we hope will inspire and unite both our Washington area community and fans around the globe", said owner Mark Ein. "There is no region in the world that attracts more people to serve the cause of justice in government, philanthropy, academia, military service, and the private sector than Washington. In fact, DC's official city motto is 'Justitia Omnibus,' which translates to 'Justice for All.' As a team representing the broader DMV region, it was important that our team identity reflects a value that unifies all of our community members, representing the full diversity of backgrounds and beliefs." The team's logo is a red, white, and blue striped shield, representing the American flag, with the Washington Monument centered in a subtle W at the bottom.

Personnel

Roster

Head coaches

Awards and records

Seasons overview

Individual accomplishments 
Role Star selections
Corey (Corey Nigra) – 2019

All-Star Game selections
ArK (Hong Yeon-jun) – 2019
Decay (Jang Gui-un) – 2020

References

External links 

 
2018 establishments in Washington, D.C.
Esports teams based in the United States
Esports teams established in 2018
Overwatch League teams
Sports in Washington, D.C.
Venture capital-funded esports teams